The DigiTech Whammy is a pitch shifter pedal manufactured by DigiTech. It was the first widely used effects pedal that could do foot-controlled pitch shifting effects. The pedal emulates sounds that a guitarist normally makes using the vibrato ("whammy") bar on the guitar, but with a greatly enhanced pitch range and without tuning issues associated with traditional vibrato bars.

Its users include Ed O'Brien and Jonny Greenwood of Radiohead, Matt Bellamy of Muse, Tom Morello of Rage Against the Machine and Audioslave, and David Gilmour of Pink Floyd.

Use 
Pitch shifters typically combine the workings of an octaver (which adds a synthesized sound one or two octaves higher or lower than the original) sound with pitch bends and harmony shifts. The Whammy digitally produces such sounds in a variety of preset settings and adds expression control by the foot pedal. A noteworthy user of the Whammy is Tom Morello, who with Rage Against the Machine and Audioslave used the Whammy to create otherwise impossible effects.

Besides Morello, Dimebag Darrell, Steve Vai, Joe Satriani, and Jack White of The White Stripes are often mentioned as expert users. David Gilmour has been using one since his Pink Floyd song "Marooned" (The Division Bell, 1994). Noel Gallagher of Oasis used a Whammy IV in his pedalboard for the Dig Out Your Soul tour in 2008-2009. Kevin Shields of My Bloody Valentine used two Whammy IV pedals whIle on tour for the album MBV. The Whammy is popular among heavy metal guitarists, with guitarists such as Virus of the bands Dope and Device, and Mikey Demus of the band Skindred using it to great lengths in both their riffs and solos alike. Other users include Jimmy Page and Page Hamilton. Guitar World described the Whammy as "one of the most iconic guitar pedals recognized by guitarists around the world".

History 

The WH-1 Whammy pedal, the original whammy, was first engineered and manufactured in 1989 by IVL Technologies and discontinued in 1993.

It is controlled by a pedal for the pitch, and a single rotary knob that selects from 16 presets—five Whammy effects, nine Harmony effects, and two Detune effects.

DigiTech Whammy II 

The DigiTech Whammy II featured a black chassis (in contrast with the series' now famous 'Ferrari red' colour).

It is controlled by an expression pedal and a button which selects the settings, which are nearly the same as the WH-1. It also has the ability to store one preset setting, which allows the user to choose any two modes and toggle between them using the setting select button.

DigiTech XP-100 Whammy-Wah 
The XP-100 Whammy/Wah was more complex, incorporating both whammy and wah-wah possibilities.

It is controlled by a rocker, and a button which selects the 29 different presets; "Volume" effect, five "Wah-Wah" effects, six "Auto Wah" effects, eight "Whammy" effects, and nine "Harmony" effects.

DigiTech Bass Whammy 
The Bass Whammy is a Whammy pedal built for bass guitar. Originally released alongside the Whammy II, it was built in the same chassis but in a deep blue color. It also featured a different set of shift and harmony options, more appropriate for use with a bass instrument.

DigiTech re-released the Bass Whammy at the 2014 Winter NAMM show. Housed in the same chassis as the DigiTech Whammy V, but again in blue, it also features the new classic/chords switch and true-bypass switching. Like the original, it is equipped with a unique set of shift and harmony options more appropriate for bass.

DigiTech Whammy IV 
The Whammy IV; the fourth edition, is closer to the WH-1 in terms of design but with several additional features, such as MIDI control and a 'Dive bomb' feature.

DigiTech Whammy DT 
The Whammy DT was released in 2011. It was the first Whammy model to use polyphonic pitch shifting as well as a host of new features including true-bypass.

The controls are similar to the controls on the previous model, but one additional knob and two additional footswitches, one of which is momentary, have been added for the new "Drop Tune" section of the pedal.

Whammy V 
The Whammy V was released in 2012. It adds additional pitch intervals, true bypass (meaning the input sound is completely unaffected when the pedal is turned off) and the ability to switch between the newer and older pitch-shifting algorithms.

MIDI controllers 
Later Whammy pedals can be controlled via MIDI program changes and control changes. In 2009, Molten Voltage released a dedicated MIDI controller for the Whammy called Molten MIDI.  In 2015, Molten Voltage released G-Quencer, which works with all four modern Whammy pedals and provides eight unique ways to control the Whammy and expand its sonic potential.

References

External links 
Digitech's page on the Whammy 
DigiTech Whammy DT Pedal Review by Premier Guitar with sound clips 
Effects units